Luis Hurtado may refer to:
 Luis Hurtado (actor) (1898–1967), Spanish actor
 Luis Hurtado (Colombian footballer) (born 1994), Colombian footballer
 Luis Hurtado (Spanish footballer) (1892–unknown), Spanish footballer